{|
 
{{Infobox ship career
|Hide header=
|Ship country=
|Ship name=Logna
|Ship flag= 
|Ship namesake= 
|Ship owner=
|Ship ordered=
|Ship builder=Bergens Mekaniske Verksted  Shipyard, Norway
|Ship original cost= 
|Ship yard number= 435
|Ship laid down= 
|Ship launched= 6 February 1958
|Ship completed= June 1958
|Ship acquired= 
|Ship in service= 1958-1969
|Ship out of service= 
|Ship registry=Liverpool UK
|Ship identification=
}} 
 
 
|}
MV Logna was built as general cargo ship in Bergens Mekaniske Verksted,  Shipyard,  Norway  in 1958. She transported cargo between Norway   and Spain  until 1969, when she was acquired by the Bahama Cement Company. In 1970, she was converted to a bulk cement carrier and she was renamed MV Island Cement.  She was used to ship bulk cement  between Freeport, Bahamas, Fort Pierce, Port Canaveral, and Fort Lauderdale, Florida, and to Eleuthera and New Providence in the Bahamas. In 1980, the Company conducted an underwater survey and determined that it was not economical to perform required repairs. Instead, the ship was decommissioned and the company planned to sell her for scrap.

The company's port engineer and underwater sports enthusiast Theo (Thanassis) Galanopoulos  instead persuaded the company to scuttle the ship as a dive site. After several months of preparation with the assistance of local volunteers and the issuance of a permit by the Government of the Bahamas, the MV Island Cement was towed about 1.5 miles off Williamstown, Grand Bahama Island and scuttled on 16 October 1982. It is approximately two miles offshore of Xanadu Beach Resort & Marina. Two buoys mark the location of "Theo's Wreck". Since 1982, the ship has become home to much marine life.

External links 

Dive Buddy 
 UK Diver Site Directory 

 UNEXSO – Freeport Bahamas   

 Theo's Wreck underwater video clip

1958 ships
Ships built in Bergen
Ships sunk as dive sites
Maritime incidents in 1982
Shipwrecks of the Bahamas
Merchant ships of Norway
Merchant ships of the Bahamas